Roman Polko (born November 8, 1962, in Tychy, Poland) is a retired Polish army special forces officer, acting chief of Biuro Bezpieczeństwa Narodowego (Bureau of National Security), former commander of "JW GROM", doctor of military science studies, speciality: management.

Polko graduated from the"Tadeusz Kościuszko Land Forces Military Academy" in Wrocław. He served in a reconnaissance unit in Dziwnów, then in the "1st Special Commando Regiment" in Lubliniec, as commander of commando groups. From 1992 until 1994 he took part in the UNPROFOR peace mission in former Yugoslavia.

In 1994 Polko began to study at the "National Defence University in Warsaw", after that he served in the position of a senior operation officer in the "Czerwone Berety" (Red Berets) in Kraków. He also finished Ranger School and Pathfinder Course in USA.

In 1999 Polko became popular commander of the "18th Landing-Assault Battalion" from Bielsko-Biała, which was a part of the Polish military contingent in the NATO KFOR forces in Kosovo. Polko was assigned as commander of the Polish contingent.

From May 26, 2000, until February 11, 2004, he was commander of the special forces unit "GROM". He commanded the GROM unit behind enemy lines in Iraq, during the Operation Iraqi Freedom.
In 2006 Polko returned to active duty, on February 23 again became commander of GROM. Since March 2006 brigadier general (generał brygady). On September 7, 2006, Polko was nominated for the post of deputy chief of Biuro Bezpieczeństwa Narodowego (Bureau of National Security). In August 2007 he became acting chief of National Security Bureau, because previous chief was nominated for the post of minister of internal affairs. On August 15, 2007, Polko was promoted to major general (generał dywizji).

He is an active sportsman, taking part in marathons, ski and parachute  instructor (master class). At the 19th Pol'and'Rock Festival  he was invited to speak at the "Akademia Sztuk Przepięknych" (eng. "Academy of (very) Beautiful Arts").

Honours and decorations
 Silver Cross of Merit
 Armed Forces in Service for the Country Medal (Silver)
 Medal for Merit for the Country Defense (Gold)
 Commendation Medal (United States Army)
 United Nations 'In The Service Of Peace' Medal - UNPROFOR
 NATO Medal for Kosovo Service
 Legion of Merit (United States)

See also
Polish Army

External links
 http://www.grom.mil.pl/

Polish generals
People from Tychy
1962 births
Living people
Foreign recipients of the Legion of Merit
Recipients of the Cross of Merit (Poland)